Ein Gedi Mineral Water is a brand of bottled water that has been in production since 1997. It is Israel's third most popular brand of bottled water, capturing 17% of the market in the country. The water used in its production comes from the Ein Gedi nature reserve.

In the wake of a deal signed in 2004, the company is jointly owned by Ein Gedi Kibbutz and Jafora-Tabori. This came as a result of a deal made in 2004.

A boycott of Ein Gedi water was proposed out of concern that its production could result in the Ein Gedi oasis drying up.

References

Mineral water
Israeli drinks
Drink companies of Israel
Bottled water brands
Products introduced in 1997
Israeli brands
Israeli companies established in 1997
Food and drink companies established in 1997